The Bootleg Series Vol. 5: Bob Dylan Live 1975, The Rolling Thunder Revue is a live album by Bob Dylan released by Columbia Records in 2002. The third installment in the ongoing Bob Dylan Bootleg Series on Legacy Records, it documents the Rolling Thunder Revue led by Dylan prior to the release of the album Desire. Until the release of this album, the only official live documentation of the Rolling Thunder Revue was Hard Rain, recorded during the less critically well received second leg of the tour.

The two-disc set received a warm reception from critics and fans, although some lamented that it does not document, or emulate, a typical complete show from the tour. Fans have also expressed exasperation at the omission of certain revered performances, notably the cover of Johnny Ace's "Never Let Me Go".

A bonus DVD accompanying the initial release of this album features two video excerpts from Dylan's 1978 film Renaldo and Clara: a November 21, 1975, performance of "Tangled Up in Blue" (included in audio form on the main album) and a December 4, 1975, performance of "Isis" (which had been included in audio form on the 1985 compilation Biograph). It spent nine weeks on the chart and was certified and awarded a gold record on March 12, 2003, by the RIAA. The album reached number 69 in the U.K.

A more comprehensive 14-disc collection entitled Bob Dylan – The Rolling Thunder Revue: The 1975 Live Recordings was released in 2019 to coincide with the Netflix documentary-film Rolling Thunder Revue: A Bob Dylan Story by Martin Scorsese.  At that time, The Bootleg Series Vol. 5 was re-issued on vinyl.

Track listing
All songs written by Bob Dylan, except where noted. All songs recorded live in concert.

Personnel
Bob Dylan — vocals, electric and acoustic guitar, harmonica
Joan Baez — vocals, acoustic guitar, percussion on "Blowin' in the Wind", "Mama, You Been on My Mind", "I Shall Be Released", and "The Water Is Wide"
Ronee Blakley — vocals
T-Bone Burnett — electric guitar, piano
David Mansfield — dobro, mandolin, violin, steel guitar
Roger McGuinn — electric guitar, vocals on "Knockin' on Heaven's Door"
Bob Neuwirth — acoustic guitar, vocals
Scarlet Rivera — violin
Luther Rix — percussion, conga, drums
Mick Ronson — electric guitar
Steven Soles — acoustic guitar and electric guitar, vocals
Rob Stoner — bass
Howie Wyeth — drums, piano

Technical personnel
Steve Berkowitz, Jeff Rosen — production
Don DeVito — recording supervision
Michael Brauer — mixing
Greg Calbi — mastering
Ricardo Chavarria — mixing assistance
Lisa Buckler, Charlie Sarrica — production coordination
Triana Dorazio — package manager
Geoff Gans — art direction, design
James L. Hunter — graphic design
Ken Regan — photography
Darren Salmieri — artist coordination

Notes
The "Blowin' in the Wind" and "Mama, You Been on My Mind" duets of Dylan and Baez on disc one were originally listed in reverse order on bobdylan.com. However, the respective recording dates of 20 November 1975 in Cambridge and 21 November 1975 (evening show) in Boston were not changed on the final insert. Baez' spoken intro to "Mama, You Been on My Mind" is said to be from Cambridge, not Boston, while "Blowin' in the Wind" is said to be from Boston.

References

2002 live albums
Bob Dylan compilation albums
Bob Dylan live albums
Columbia Records live albums